Tura Satana was an American metal band named after cult actress Tura Satana. The band started in the early 1990s under the name Manhole. Due to legal reasons they changed it after the release of their first album All Is Not Well. While the music was brutal and powerful, the lyrics of the first album were strongly influenced by singer Tairrie B's hardships as a woman having dealt with a dysfunctional family and violence.

Their second (and final) offering was the religious influenced Relief Through Release. Throughout their career, the band has shared the stage with rock big names such as Human Waste Project, Snot, Marilyn Manson, Deftones, Type O Negative, Incubus and Limp Bizkit.

After they disbanded, Tairrie B went on to form My Ruin and Brian Harrah went on to play in Professional Murder Music, and subsequently The Mercy Clinic, which featured Pat Lachman, former vocalist for Damageplan. Bassist Rico Villasenor went on to play in Downset, as well as Drunk with Power and Demean, both featuring Downset guitarist, Brian "Ares" Schwager. Rico currently plays with Drunk with Power guitarist, and famed Graffiti artist, Axis in the LA based Metal band The Pain.

Band members
 Tairrie B - Vocals
 Brian Harrah - Guitar
 Rico Villasenor - Bass
 Marcelo Palomino - Drums

Former members
 Scott Ueda - Guitar (1993–1997)
 Marty Ramirez - Guitar (1993–1994)
 Stephen Klein - Bass (1993–1995)
 Louiche Mayorga - Bass (1996)

Discography

References

External links
Tairrie B interview in Metal Maidens from March 1997

American alternative metal musical groups
Nu metal musical groups from California
Noise Records artists